Corella Railway Station is a closed railway station on Queensland's North Coast railway line.

References

Disused railway stations in Queensland
North Coast railway line, Queensland